William Martin Carrick (September 5, 1873 – March 7, 1932) was an American pitcher in Major League Baseball. He was nicknamed Doughnut Bill.

He played for the New York Giants and the Washington Senators in a span of five seasons from  through .

Carrick's best pitch was the curveball. At one point during the 1901 season, he lost seventeen consecutive decisions.

Following his major league career, Carrick continued to be active in professional ball in the minor leagues, while pitching for the Seattle Siwashes (1903), Toledo Mud Hens (1903), Fall River Indians (1905), Newark Sailors (1906–1907), and the New Haven Blues/New Haven Black Crows (1908/1909). He then managed for New Haven (renamed the Prairie Hens) in 1910.

References

External links
, or Retrosheet

1873 births
1932 deaths
Major League Baseball pitchers
New York Giants (NL) players
Washington Senators (1901–1960) players
Minor league baseball managers
Adrian Demons players
Adrian Reformers players
Canton Deubers players
Fall River Indians players
Fort Wayne Farmers players
Kenton Babes players
New Haven Black Crows players
New Haven Blues players
Newark Colts players
Newark Sailors players
Seattle Siwashes players
Toledo Mud Hens players
Baseball players from Pennsylvania
Sportspeople from Erie, Pennsylvania
19th-century baseball players